Tricia Walsh-Smith (born 24 March 1956) is an English playwright and actress. Her plays include Bonkers, Addictions, The Last Journey  and musical Change The Day.

Early life
Born in RAF Gütersloh, Germany, Walsh-Smith was part of a military family which travelled the world until her RAF father's death when she was twelve. She then settled briefly in her mother's hometown of Beverley in the East Riding of Yorkshire, England. Walsh-Smith attended the Italia Conti Academy from the age of fifteen.

Career
Walsh-Smith appeared in over five hundred commercials on British and European television, including as a schoolgirl in the commercial for Hellmann's Mayonnaise. Her television and film roles include the British horror film, Terror (1978), Kenny Everett Video Show, Constant Hot Water, Dick Emery and the children's television drama, Grange Hill.

She has written the play Bonkers which premiered in London in 1987.

Walsh-Smith's play, Addictions, has been used at a number of benefit readings to raise awareness and generate charitable giving for addicts. In 2007, Walsh-Smith cancelled one production of the play after learning that Smirnoff Vodka had become a sponsor. She said: "I was absolutely stunned. I couldn't believe it. The idea of having Smirnoff sponsoring this play, which is about addiction – what were they thinking? ... If we had gone ahead, I would have been looked at as a total hypocrite."

In December 2008, Walsh-Smith released the song "I'm Going Bonkers" on iTunes Its video featured her dancing around London. The video went viral and quickly became YouTube's number one entertainment video.

Walsh-Smith has previewed many of her comedy songs at nightclubs in London and at the O2 Arena and some of the songs were featured in the 12-part television series Pineapple Dance Studios, which aired in 2010 on Sky1 in the UK. The series was popular and after initially indicating that a second series would be produced, Sky1 reverted this decision due to failing to come to terms with studio owner Debbie Moore.

In 2011, Walsh Smith appeared in Louie Spence's Showbusiness, also on Sky1. For this series, she made two music videos: "Stuff Ding Dong Merrily On High!" for the Christmas Special; and "Should I Go In The Jungle?", which was reportedly a lampooning of the ITV1 series, "I'm a Celebrity...Get Me Out of Here!". Episode Ten featured a workshop of her musical, Change The Day. Pineapple Dance Studios was sold around the world and aired on the US network Ovation in 2014.

Walsh-Smith has appeared as a guest on The Insider (CBS), Good Morning America, (ABC), Inside Edition, (CBS), Geraldo, (Fox), Extra, (NBC), The Jeff Probst Show, (CBS), Sunrise (Channel 7), Access Hollywood, (NBC), Harry Hill's TV Burp, (ITV), The Noughties, (BBC Three), and On the Record with Greta Van Susteren.

Personal life
She met her first husband John Obertelli in 1975 and married him in 1981. They had a son, Jamie. They divorced in 1989. She then had a brief second marriage to American businessman Jerald Arnold. She met her third husband, Philip J. Smith (CEO of The Shubert Organization), at a Park Avenue wedding reception in 1995. The two married in New York City in 1999 and divorced in 2008.

Divorce from Philip Smith
In April 2008, Walsh-Smith made history and attracted international attention for posting a YouTube video of herself discussing her divorce from her husband, CEO and then president of the Shubert Organization, Philip J. Smith. In the video she stated that she was going to be unfairly evicted from her house and called her husband's secretary on speakerphone. Some legal experts consider this the first known case where a spouse has used YouTube in an attempt to gain leverage over the other in a divorce case. Fox News named the initial video one of "The Top 5 Viral Videos of 2008."

Walsh-Smith's case generated scrutiny and debate by legal experts on the implications of broadcasting personal issues using media like YouTube. Regarding the legal implications in the divorce case, MSNBC's senior legal analyst Susan Filan told the show, "A judge isn't really going to care. In the end, a divorce, as upsetting and emotional as it is, is just a financial transaction. You're trying to make one household go into two. Somebody's going to have to give something to somebody else."

On 21 July 2008 a Manhattan judge awarded Philip Smith a divorce from Tricia Walsh-Smith. The judge, Harold Beeler, criticised Walsh-Smith for her YouTube video. "She has attempted to turn the life of her husband into a soap opera by directing, writing, acting in and producing a melodrama." Walsh-Smith was unimpressed with the judge's decision, saying that she would be better off in Baghdad.
On 25 November 2008, Shubert Organization and Shubert Foundation chairman Gerald Schoenfeld died from a heart attack. On 2 December 2008, the Shubert Organization announced Philip Smith as Schoenfeld's successor. The New York Times said, "In an appointment that promises more continuity than change, Philip J. Smith was named chairman of the Shubert Organization and the Shubert Foundation – perhaps the single most powerful position in the theater world." Coincidentally, hours after the news of Philip Smith's new position was announced Walsh-Smith released the song  "I'm Going Bonkers," on iTunes. Its video featured her dancing around London, effectively stealing Smith's thunder. The video went viral and quickly became YouTube's number one entertainment video.

Defrauded by Giovanni Di Stefano
Four of the fraud counts against bogus lawyer Giovanni Di Stefano related to Walsh-Smith. Di Stefano claimed that he could overturn the Walsh-Smith pre-nuptial agreement, and persuaded Walsh-Smith to invest in News of the World online as Walsh-Smith had been a contributor with a weekly column, "Livin' an' Lovin' with Tricia Walsh-Smith". On 23 March 2012, News International, the paper's former publisher, sued Di Stefano for violating its trademark.

On learning that she had been conned, Walsh-Smith set up a fake TV interview with Di Stefano outside the Royal Courts of Justice, to challenge him on his fraudulent behavior, and uploaded the video on YouTube. The Scottish Sunday Mail ran a piece headlined; "The Devil's Advocate Took me for a Mug."  In the article Walsh-Smith said that Di Stefano duped her into handing over more than 100,000 pounds; "He got me to invest in an online version of the News of the World after the paper was shut down. He told me Rupert Murdoch was involved but the cash disappeared." Subsequently, Di Stefano complained to the Press Complaints Commission about the article. The Sunday Mail then agreed to print a statement stating, "Giovanni Di Stefano has denied ripping off Tricia Walsh-Smith."

On 27 March 2013, Di Stefano was found guilty on all four counts relating to Walsh-Smith; nine counts of obtaining a money transfer by deception, eight counts of fraud, three counts of acquiring criminal property, two counts of using a false instrument, one count of attempting to obtain a money transfer by deception, one count of obtaining property by deception and one count of using criminal property. He subsequently pleaded guilty to two additional counts: defrauding a couple out of £160,000, including a woman's life savings of £75,000, and stealing £150,000 from a man who had been in a car accident and lost a limb. He was sentenced to fourteen years in prison.

On 4 April 2014, eight and a half years were added to Di Stefano's fourteen-year sentence, unless he compensated his victims immediately. The judge who jailed him in March 2013 at Southwark Crown Court, Alistair McCreath, told him to "pay back £1.4million forthwith or serve the extra time." He said Di Stefano had no intention of paying and had "stuck up two fingers to the court".

References

External links

1956 births
Living people
British Internet celebrities
20th-century English actresses
English dramatists and playwrights
Alumni of the Italia Conti Academy of Theatre Arts
People from Beverley
English television actresses